Engina goncalvesi is a species of sea snail, a marine gastropod mollusk in the family Pisaniidae,.

Description

Distribution

References

 Coltro J. 2005. Three new Buccinidae (Mollusca: Gastropoda) from Brazil. Strombus, 12: 1-6

External links

Pisaniidae
Gastropods described in 2005